"Even It Up" is a song recorded by the rock band Heart. It was released in 1980 as the first single from the band's fifth studio album Bebe le Strange.  The song is an uptempo rock and roll number which lyrically is sung by a woman who is demanding that her lover "even it up" by reciprocating the effort that she has put forth in their relationship.

Cash Box said it has "steamy lead guitar riffs" and "aggressively sensual lead vocals."

This song is the first of three Heart tunes to utilize the Tower of Power horn section, along with their cover of Aaron Neville's "Tell It Like It Is" and "Tall Dark Handsome Stranger" from 1990's Brigade.

"Even It Up" peaked at number 33 on the U.S. Billboard Hot 100.

"That song was written in about '79 or '80, and it was definitely a response to being obstructed as women in the rock field. There are so many systemic things that get thrown up in front of you, different glass walls and stuff. We were speaking out against it then," said singer Ann Wilson.

Chart performance

References 

Heart (band) songs
1980 singles
Songs written by Sue Ennis
Songs written by Nancy Wilson (rock musician)
Songs written by Ann Wilson
Epic Records singles
1980 songs
Song recordings produced by Mike Flicker